is a Japanese gravure idol and actress known for her role as Mitsuki Aoyagi/Akiba Blue in the 2012 Super Sentai parody series Unofficial Sentai Akibaranger. She was affiliated with Stardust Promotion.

Filmography

TV series
Hammer Session! (2010)
Rokudenashi Blues (2011)
Unofficial Sentai Akibaranger as Mitsuki Aoyagi/Akiba Blue (2012)
Unofficial Sentai Akibaranger: Season 2 as Mitsuki Aoyagi/Akiba Blue (2013, episode 1)

TV commercials
Harvest Moon: The Tale of Two Towns (2010)
Pepsi NEX (2012)

Film
Vanished: Age 7 (2011)
Princess Sakura: Forbidden Pleasures (2013)
Shimauma (2016)
The Gun (2018)
21st Century Girl (2019)
Rolling Marbles (2019)
The Forest of Love (2019)
The Gun 2020 (2020)
Owari ga Hajimari (2021)

References

External links
Official profile at Stardust Promotion 
Official blog at Ameba 

21st-century Japanese actresses
Japanese female models
Japanese gravure models
Japanese women pop singers
Japanese television personalities
1994 births
Living people
Actors from Aichi Prefecture
Models from Aichi Prefecture
21st-century Japanese singers
21st-century Japanese women singers